The men's 1500 meter at the 2011 KNSB Dutch Single Distance Championships took place in Heerenveen at the Thialf ice skating rink on Sunday 7 November 2010. Although this tournament was held in 2010 it was part of the speed skating season 2010–2011. There were 24 participants.

Statistics

Result

Draw

References

Single Distance Championships
2012 Single Distance